Barry Maitland (born 1941 in Scotland) is an Australian author of crime fiction.  After studying architecture at Cambridge, Maitland practised and taught in the UK before moving to Australia, where he became a Professor of Architecture at the University of Newcastle.  He retired in 2000 and took up writing full-time.

Novels

Brock and Kolla
Maitland has written a series of crime novels known as the Brock and Kolla novels, focussing on Scotland Yard detectives, DCI David Brock and DS Katherine Kolla :
The Marx Sisters (1994)
The Malcontenta (1995)
All My Enemies (1996)
The Chalon Heads (1999)
Silvermeadow (2000)
Babel (2002)
The Verge Practice (2003)
No Trace (2004)
Spider Trap (2006)
Dark Mirror (2009)
Chelsea Mansions (2011)
The Raven's Eye (2013)
The Promised Land (2019)
The Russian Wife (2021)

Harry Belltree trilogy
In September, 2014 Maitland published the first of the Harry Belltree trilogy.

Crucifixion Creek: The Belltree Trilogy, Book One, ASIN B00LZ1U6IY, Text (24 September 2014)
Ash Island (2015)
Slaughter Park (2016)

Others
  Bright Air (2008)

Awards 

Ned Kelly Awards for Crime Writing, "Best Novel"
1996, joint winner for The Malcontenta
2000, shortlisted for Chalon Heads and Silvermeadow
2003, shortlisted for Babel
2005, shortlisted for No Trace
2007, shortlisted for Spider Trap
2009, shortlisted for Bright Air

References

External links
Barry Maitland's website
Review of The Marx Sisters – Kirkus Reviews (May 2010)
Review of Crucifixion Creek  – AustCrime (January 2015)
Review of The Promised Land – Booklover Book Reviews (January 2019)

1941 births
Living people
20th-century Australian novelists
21st-century Australian novelists
Australian crime writers
Australian crime fiction writers
Australian mystery writers
Australian male novelists
Ned Kelly Award winners
20th-century Australian male writers
21st-century Australian male writers
Scottish emigrants to Australia